The National Council of Women in India, was a women's organization in India, founded in 1925. 

It was the second of the first three major feminist organizations in India, alongside Women's Indian Association (WIA) and All-India Women's Conference (AIWC) 1927. 

It became India's representative in the International Council of Women (ICW).

References

Organizations established in 1925
1925 establishments in India
Women's rights organizations
Women's organisations based in India
Feminism in India
History of women in India